Wang Xiaobo (May 13, 1952 – April 11, 1997) was a renowned contemporary Chinese novelist and essayist from Beijing.

Life
On May 13, 1952, Wang Xiaobo was born in a family of intellectuals in Beijing. From 1968 to 1970, he was transferred to Yunnan Farm as an "Educated Youth". In 1971, he jumped to the team in Muping District, Yantai City, Shandong Province, and later became a private teacher. In 1972, he worked in Beijing Niujie Teaching Instrument Factory, and in 1974 he worked in Beijing Xicheng District Semiconductor Factory. This period of working life is the writing background of his novels such as "Love in Revolutionary Period".
In 1977, he met and fell in love with Li Yinhe who was the editor of Guangming Daily. In 1980, Wang Xiaobo and Li Yinhe married. In the same year, he published his debut work "Earth Forever". Entered the Department of Trade and Economics of Renmin University of China in 1978, with a bachelor's degree. Studying major in trade economics and commodity science. In 1982, he worked as a teacher at Renmin University of China, when Wang Xiaobo began to write . In 1968, he began to try to write in Yunnan Corps. This is the writing background of The Golden Age and the inspiration for his debut work The Endlessness. In 1984, he studied at the Center for East Asian Studies at the University of Pittsburgh and received a master's degree. He began to write novels based on the legend of Tang Dynasty, during which he got the guidance of Mr. Xu Zhuoyun. While studying in the United States, Wang Xiaobo traveled all over the United States, and used his summer vacation in 1986 to travel to the countries of Western Europe.
He returned to China in 1988 and served as a lecturer in the Department of Sociology of Peking University. In 1991, he served as a lecturer in the Accounting Department of Renmin University of China. He has been a freelance writer since 1992. His only screenplay "East Palace West Palace" won the Best Screenplay Award at the Argentine International Film Festival and was nominated for the 1997 Cannes International Film Festival.
Passed away in Beijing on April 11, 1997 (after autopsy, it was confirmed that the cause of death was a heart attack). Since then, his works have become popular all over the world, and his style has become the target of countless youths to imitate.

Writing style
Wang Xiaobo was best known for vernacular narration. He also published essays, which served as the primary entry point to his work. Wang Xiaobo's experience of living and studying in the East and the West has made him a writer full of free humanistic spirit and independent intellectual character. In a letter to his teacher Xu Zhuoyun, Wang Xiaobo also stated that he tried not to be nudity but fascinating to write sexual content into his novels.
His unique black humor runs through his works, which also show Wang Xiaobo's attitude towards life and life. Wang Xiaobo’s series of novels were drawn from his life experiences, like the experiences of intellectual youths in Yunnan and engineers engaged in technical work. The age and background of the works are also related to Wang Xiaobo’s life and life. Growth periods overlap. In these works, he portrays a reality: "I see a world without intelligence, but wisdom exists in chaos; I see a world without sex, but sex exists in chaos; I see a boring world, but interesting exists in the chaos".
Judging from the essays, the philosopher Bertrand Russell had a deep influence on his thoughts. He admired and advocated science and rationality, and believed that people's life should pursue the unknown. He opposed the imprisonment of thoughts and advocated that people's thinking should be diverse, to make life interesting, and that they should love wisdom. His work was particularly influential with college students in the 1990s, but his influence is still felt. He wrote the screenplay for "East Palace West Palace", and won the best screenwriter at the Argentine International Film Festival.

Wang Xiaobo phenomenon
Wang Xiaobo won the "United Daily News" novella award two times before his death, and was widely praised in overseas Chinese literature circles. But when he hoped to enter the mainland literary system, he was met with unprecedented coldness, and it was even difficult to publish works. Wang Xiaobo confessed in the postscript of his collection of novels "Golden Age": "This book was published thanks to an indomitable will and a positive attitude towards life. It must be said that these excellent qualities are not owned by the author. In view of the fact that publishing this book is better than writing this This book is much more difficult, so if there is something about this book, it belongs to all the friends who helped publish it."
The sudden death of Wang Xiaobo in 1997 marked the beginning of the Wang Xiaobo phenomenon. His works have been disseminated and accepted unprecedentedly, and have prompted serious reactions in both the folk and intellectual circles. In the 21st century, he is among the most-read of 1990s Chinese novelists  Various forms of Wang Xiaobo commemorative meetings and work seminars continue. For a time, Wang Xiaobo's phenomenon swept the literary, literary and literary criticism circles.
The explosion of Wang Xiaobo's phenomenon lies in his essays. It is worth mentioning that his essays have received attention before him. Critics have compared Wang Xiaobo's heat to Chen Yinke's heat, the second boom of the liberal wave in China.
Though Wang Xiabo continues to be very popular , mainstream critical reaction to his novels has been limited and the focus of interest is his essays.
Before his death, Wang Xiaobo once said, "One day we will all die, and there will be people walking on the path of pursuing wisdom. I can't see what happens after death. But when I was alive, I thought about it, and I thought about it in my heart. I'm very happy." The famous contemporary Chinese writer Wang Meng commented on Wang Xiaobo: “Wang Xiaobo is a very thoughtful person. I am interested in his philosophical prose and essays. But for his novels, to be honest, I didn’t finish reading them because of his style is not great to my appetite."
Huang Ping, a professor of the Chinese Department of East China Normal University and a young critic: "(Wang Xiaobo) joking about aesthetics, a masterpiece of a generation".
Gao Xiaosong regards him as a "god-like existence";
Feng Tang said he was "a miracle" and "a very good start."

Wang has been identified as an inspiration for and early representative of minjian, grassroot intellectuals, a population of alternative intellectuals who were able to grow around the 2000s in China.

List of works
Wang Xiaobo wrote several novels, short stories collections and essays, some of which have been translated into English, French and Italian.

Novels
 《红拂夜奔》 Running Away At Night
 《万寿寺》 Wan Show Temple
 《黄金时代》 
 《白银时代》 The Silver Age
 《青铜时代》 The Bronze Age
 《黑铁时代》 The Iron Age
 《夜里两点钟》 Half Past Two At Night
 《茫茫黑夜漫游》 The Vast Tour
 《樱桃红》 Red Like Cherries
 《寻找无双》 Looking for Wushuang or In Search of Wushuang
《三十而立》
《似水流年》
《革命时期的爱情》 Love in the Time of Revolution
《我的阴阳两界》

Plays
 《东宫·西宫》

Short story collections and Essays
 《沉默的大多数》 
 《思维的乐趣》 
 《我的精神家园》 My Spiritual Homeland
 《理想国与哲人王》 Utopia and the Philosopher King
 《爱你就像爱生命》 Loving You Is Like Loving Life
 《一只特立独行的猪》 A Maverick Pig
 《他们的世界：中国男同性恋群落透视》Their World: A Look at the Chinese Male Homosexuality Community (Coauthored with Li Yinhe)

Filmography
 1997 : East Palace, West Palace by Zhang Yuan, adapted from his short story 《似水柔情》 Sentiments like water.

Attitude

Some people had commented Wang’s works that though they were interesting, they lack a positive theme and cannot inspire us, etc. Wang responded:
“Though the author is a modest person, he cannot accept those opinions. Being positive is one of our norms, but it should not be always mentioned. I think my duty is writing interesting novels as possible as I can, and should not add some deliberate sermon. My writing attitude is to write some works for those people who read novels, not to teach undereducated youth...”

External links
 WangXiaobo Net
 works of wangxiaobo collection
 
 Article by the magazine Rue89 (In French)
 Italian publication of the short novel 2015 (in Italian)
 Introduction to the English translation published by the State University of New York Press

References

1952 births
1997 deaths
Writers from Beijing
Academic staff of Peking University
Renmin University of China alumni
University of Pittsburgh alumni
People's Republic of China essayists
Educators from Beijing
20th-century novelists
20th-century essayists